Maxie Cleveland "Max" Robinson, Jr. (May 1, 1939 – December 20, 1988) was an American broadcast journalist, most notably serving as co-anchor on ABC World News Tonight alongside Frank Reynolds and Peter Jennings from 1978 until 1983. Robinson is noted as the first African-American broadcast network news anchor in the United States. Robinson was a founder of the National Association of Black Journalists.

Biography

Early life and education
Robinson was born the second of four children (his siblings were his sister Jewell, who became a teacher; his brother Randall, a Harvard-educated lawyer; and his sister Jean, a publicist) to Maxie, a teacher and Doris Robinson in Richmond, Virginia. The schools in Richmond were still segregated when he attended them; after graduating from Armstrong High School, Robinson attended Oberlin College, where he was freshman class president; however, he stayed there for only a year and a half and did not graduate.  Robinson briefly served in the United States Air Force and was assigned to the Russian Language School at Indiana University before receiving a medical discharge. He began working in radio early on, including a short time at WSSV-AM in Petersburg, Virginia, where he called himself "Max the Player," and later at WANT-AM, Richmond.

Career
Robinson began his television career in 1959, when he was hired for a news job at WTOV-TV in Portsmouth, Virginia. Robinson had to read the news while hidden behind a slide of the station's logo. One night, Robinson had the slide removed, and was fired the next day.
He later went to WRC-TV in Washington, DC, and stayed for three years, winning six journalism awards for coverage of civil-rights events such as the riots that followed the 1968 assassination of Dr. Martin Luther King Jr. It was during this time that Robinson won two regional Emmys for a documentary he made on black life in Anacostia entitled The Other Washington. In 1969, Robinson joined the Eyewitness News team at WTOP-TV (now WUSA-TV) in Washington, D.C. Robinson was teamed with anchor Gordon Peterson, becoming the first African-American anchor on a local television news program, and the newscast took off. During that time, he was so well-liked by viewers that when Hanafi Muslims took hostages at the B'nai B'rith building in Washington they would speak only with Robinson.

ABC News and World News Tonight
In 1978, when Roone Arledge was looking to revamp ABC News' nightly news broadcast into World News Tonight, he remembered Robinson from a 60 Minutes interview, and hired him to be a part of his new three-anchor format. Robinson would anchor national news from Chicago, while Peter Jennings would anchor international news in London and Frank Reynolds would be the main anchor from Washington.  Robinson thus became the first black man to anchor a nightly network news broadcast. The three-man co-anchor team was a ratings success, and launched spoofs regarding how the three would pitch stories to each other during the telecast by saying the other's name:  "Frank"..."Max"...."Peter," etc.

Robinson's ABC tenure was marked by conflicts between himself and the management of ABC News over viewpoints and the portrayal of Black America in the news. He was known by his co-workers to show up late for work or sometimes not show up at all, along with his moods, and his use of alcohol escalated. In addition, Robinson was known to fight racism at any turn and often felt unworthy of the admiration he received and was not pleased with what he had accomplished. Together with Bob Strickland, Robinson established a program for mentoring young black broadcast journalists.

During most of Robinson's tenure, ABC News used the Westar satellite to feed Robinson's segment of WNT from Chicago to New York.  TVRO receiver earth stations were also coming into use at the time, and anyone who knew where to find the satellite feeds could view the feed. On the live feed, Robinson could be seen to have a drink or two, but never during the actual aired segment, which led some bars around the country to even have drink specials during the nearly 90 minutes, and invited patrons to come in and see the "Max 'R'" feed.  ABC eventually caught on to what was happening, and even resorted to hide what was going on by supering a slide with the words "ABC News Chicago" on the screen during the live feed during times that Robinson was not live over the actual WNT broadcast. In addition, Robinson could often be seen being harsh towards those who worked around him during the live feed. Reynolds died in 1983, and shortly afterward Jennings was named sole anchor of World News Tonight.  Robinson was relegated to the weekend anchor post, as well as reading hourly news briefs. He left ABC in 1983, and joined WMAQ-TV in Chicago in March 1984; he was the station's first black anchor. But his tenure with the station was rocky, and he had conflicts with some of his colleagues. He was also frequently absent.  Robinson retired in 1985.

Personal life

Marriages 
Robinson was married three times. Two ended in divorce, one in annulment. His first marriage was to Eleanor Booker from 1963 to 1968 and they had three children: Mark, Maureen and Michael. His second marriage was to Hazel O'Leary from 1974 to 1975. Robinson's final marriage was to Beverly Hamilton from 1977 to 1986, with whom he had another son, Malik. Robinson was the older brother of Randall Robinson.

Health and death
Robinson was found to have AIDS while he was hospitalized for pneumonia in Blue Island, Illinois, but he kept it a secret, refusing to discuss it, despite widespread rumors about why his health was deteriorating.  In the fall of 1988, Robinson was in Washington to deliver a speech at Howard University's School of Communications when he became increasingly ill. Robinson checked himself into Howard University Hospital where he died of complications due to AIDS on December 20, 1988. He had asked that his family reveal that he had AIDS so that, according to the new reports, “Others in the black community would be alerted to the dangers and the need for treatment and education.” He was buried at Lincoln Memorial Cemetery in Suitland, Maryland.

References

6.^Grogan, David, "Spilling Secrets." People Magazine. January 31, 1994:4.Print.

External links

 
 
 
 Africanpubs Biography
 
 ABC News' "Time Tunnel" page containing clips of numerous newscasts on which Robinson appeared

1939 births
1988 deaths
ABC News personalities
African-American journalists
African-American television personalities
African-American writers
AIDS-related deaths in Washington, D.C.
American broadcast news analysts
Television anchors from Chicago
Emmy Award winners
Indiana University alumni
Oberlin College alumni
People from Richmond, Virginia
College of William & Mary faculty
University of the District of Columbia people
Virginia Union University alumni
Television anchors from Washington, D.C.
American male journalists